353 (three hundred fifty-three) is the natural number following 352 and preceding 354. It is a prime number.

In mathematics
353 is a palindromic prime, an irregular prime, and a super-prime. 

In connection with Euler's sum of powers conjecture, 353 is the smallest number whose 4th power is equal to the sum of four other 4th powers, as discovered by R. Norrie in 1911:

In a seven-team round robin tournament, there are 353 combinatorially distinct outcomes in which no subset of teams wins all its games against the teams outside the subset; mathematically, there are 353 strongly connected tournaments on seven nodes.

353 is one of the solutions to the stamp folding problem: there are exactly 353 ways to fold a strip of eight blank stamps into a single flat pile of stamps.

References

Integers